Aston juxta Mondrum is a village and civil parish in the unitary authority of Cheshire East and the ceremonial county of Cheshire, England. It is about four miles north of Nantwich. The civil parish also includes part of Worleston village.

Etymology
The name of the village means 'Aston near Mondrum [forest],' presumably to set it apart from other places named 'Aston.'

History
The village is mentioned in the Domesday Book as consisting of three households. Worleston Dairy Institute was located in the civil parish, and received a royal visit from George V and Queen Mary in 1913. The institute closed in 1926.

Demographics
According to the 2001 Census the parish had a population of 133, in 55 households. The population of the civil parish had risen at the 2011 Census to 292. The historical population figures were 111 (1801), 171 (1851), 194 (1901) and 141 (1951).

Landmarks

The grade-II-listed St Oswald's Church, founded 1873, is in Worleston village. A major fire in 1997 damaged the roof, chancel and organ loft; the church has since been restored. St Oswald's has been administered since 1991 as a united benefice, the Cross Country Group of Parish Churches, with St Mary's, Acton, St Bartholomew's, Church Minshull, and St David's, Wettenhall. It falls into the rural deanery of Nantwich and the diocese of Chester. Since 2007, the vicar has been the Reverend Peter Lillicrap. A magazine, Cross Country, is circulated across all four churches.

St Oswald's CE Primary School on Church Lane was originally Worleston National School and is still often referred to as "Worleston School". The present building dates from 1887, although there are records of the school as early as 1863.

See also

Listed buildings in Aston juxta Mondrum

Notes

Further reading
Latham FA, ed. Acton (The Local History Group; 1995)

External links

 

Villages in Cheshire
Civil parishes in Cheshire